Les Âmes fortes ("the strong souls") is a 1949 novel by the French writer Jean Giono. It was the basis for the 2001 film Savage Souls, directed by Raúl Ruiz.

References

1949 French novels
French novels adapted into films
French-language novels
Novels by Jean Giono